Peter Verdaguer y Prat (Sant Pere de Torelló, December 10, 1835 – Texas, October 26, 1911) was a Catalan-born prelate of the Roman Catholic Church. He served as Vicar Apostolic of Brownsville from 1890 until his death in 1911.

Biography
Peter Verdaguer y Prat was born in Sant Pere de Torelló, county of Osona in the Province of Barcelona, to Francisco Verdaguer and Maria Prat Verdaguer. He attended the seminaries of Vic and Barcelona before coming to the United States, where he completed his theological studies at St. Vincent's Seminary in Cape Girardeau, Missouri. He was ordained to the priesthood by Bishop Thaddeus Amat y Brusi, C.M., on December 12, 1862. He then did pastoral work in the Diocese of Monterey-Los Angeles, California, serving as a missionary and pastor of San Bernardino and in Los Angeles.

On July 25, 1890, Verdaguer was appointed the Vicar Apostolic of Brownsville, Texas, and Titular Bishop of Aulon by Pope Leo XIII. He received his consecration on the following November 9 in Barcelona from Bishop Jaime Catalá y Albosa, the Bishop of Barcelona, with Bishops José Morgades y Gili and José Meseguer y Costa serving as co-consecrators.

Returning to the United States, Verdaguer arrived in his new vicariate the following spring. He then removed the episcopal see from Corpus Christi to Laredo. He invited several religious institutes into the vicariate, including the Sisters of Mercy, Claretians, and Sisters of Charity of the Incarnate Word. He opened two hospitals, several churches and parochial schools, and an orphanage. He increased the number of priests from 10 to 32 and saw Catholics increase by 40,000.

Verdaguer died while traveling to Mercedes for Confirmation ceremonies, aged 75. He is buried at Laredo Catholic Cemetery.

References

External links
Roman Catholic Diocese of Corpus Christi

1835 births
1911 deaths
19th-century Roman Catholic bishops in the United States
20th-century Roman Catholic bishops in the United States
American people of Catalan descent
People from Corpus Christi, Texas
People from Osona
Spanish Roman Catholic missionaries
Spanish emigrants to the United States
St. Vincent's Seminary (Missouri) alumni
Roman Catholic missionaries in the United States
Catholics from Texas